Jeffrey Grossman is an American engineer, the Morton and Claire Goulder and Family Professor in Environmental Systems at the Massachusetts Institute of Technology.

His research has included the development of materials that can store solar energy chemically, and then release the energy at a later time as heat, a process for constructing electronic components out of coal, novel three-dimensional arrangements for solar panels, and studies on the use of graphene for water desalination.

References

External links
Home page

Year of birth missing (living people)
Living people
MIT School of Engineering faculty
21st-century American engineers
Johns Hopkins University alumni
University of Illinois alumni